Rita Ináncsi (born 6 January 1971 in Budapest) is a retired Hungarian heptathlete.

Achievements

Awards
 Hungarian athlete of the Year (3): 1994, 1995, 1996

External links

1971 births
Living people
Hungarian heptathletes
Athletes (track and field) at the 1992 Summer Olympics
Athletes (track and field) at the 1996 Summer Olympics
Athletes (track and field) at the 2000 Summer Olympics
Olympic athletes of Hungary
Athletes from Budapest
World Athletics Championships medalists
European Athletics Championships medalists